Theal may refer to 
George McCall Theal (1837-1919), South African historian
Theal (film), a 2021 Indian film
Dyphylline